This article lists feature-length British films and full-length documentaries that had their premiere in 2022 and were at least partly produced by the United Kingdom. It does not feature short films, medium-length films, made-for-TV films, pornographic films, filmed theater, VR films or interactive films, nor does it include films screened in previous years that have official release dates in 2022.

British films box office 
The highest-grossing British films released in 2022, by domestic box office gross revenue, are as follows:

Film premieres

January–March

April–June

July–September

October–December

Other premieres

Culturally British films 
The following list comprises films not produced by Great Britain or the United Kingdom but is strongly associated with British culture. The films in this list should fulfil at least three of the following criteria:
 The film is adapted from a British source material.
 The story is at least partially set in the United Kingdom.
 The film was at least partially shot in the United Kingdom.
 Many of the film's cast and crew members are British.

The Batman and Doctor Strange in the Multiverse of Madness fulfill two of the criteria.

Events

British Academy Film Awards
The 75th British Academy Film Awards was held on 13 March 2022.

British winners 

Listed here are the British winners and nominees at two of the most prestigious film award ceremonies in the English-speaking world: the Academy Awards and the Golden Globe Awards, celebrating the best films of 2021 and early 2022.

Academy Awards
The 94th Academy Awards were held on March 27, 2022.

British winners:
 Belfast (Best Original Screenplay)
 No Time to Die (Best Original Song)
 The Power of the Dog (Best Director)
 Jenny Beavan for Cruella (Best Costume Design)
 Joe Walker for Dune (Best Film Editing)
 Kenneth Branagh for Belfast (Best Original Screenplay)
 Linda Dowds for The Eyes of Tammy Faye (Best Makeup and Hairstyling)
 Paul Lambert for Dune (Best Visual Effects)
 Riz Ahmed for The Long Goodbye (Best Live Action Short Film)
 Theo Green for Dune (Best Sound)
 Tristan Myles for Dune (Best Visual Effects)
 The Long Goodbye (Best Live Action Short Film)

British nominees:
 Belfast (Best Picture, Best Director, Best Supporting Actor, Best Supporting Actress, Best Original Song, Best Sound)
 Cyrano (Best Costume Design)
 No Time to Die (Best Sound, Best Visual Effects)
 Flee (Best Animated Feature Film, Best International Feature Film, Best Documentary Feature)
  The Power of the Dog (Best Picture, Best Actor, Best Supporting Actor, Best Supporting Actress, Best Adapted Screenplay, Best Original Score, Best Sound, Best Production Design, Best Cinematography, Best Film Editing)
 Spencer (Best Actress)
 Andrew Garfield for Tick, Tick... Boom! (Best Actor)
 Andy Nelson for West Side Story (Best Sound)
 Benedict Cumberbatch for The Power of the Dog (Best Actor)
 Charlie Noble for No Time to Die (Best Visual Effects) 
 Chris Corbould for No Time to Die (Best Visual Effects)
 Christopher Townsend for Shang-Chi and the Legend of the Ten Rings (Best Visual Effects)
 Denise Yarde for Belfast (Best Sound)
 Donald Mowat for Dune (Best Makeup and Hairstyling)
 Iain Canning for The Power of the Dog (Best Picture)
 James Harrison for No Time to Die (Best Sound)
 James Mather for No Time to Die (Best Sound)
 Joanna Quinn for Affairs of the Art (Best Animated Short Film)
 Joel Green for No Time to Die (Best Visual Effects)
 Jonathan Fawkner for No Time to Die (Best Visual Effects)
 Jonny Greenwood for The Power of the Dog (Best Original Score)
 Judi Dench for Belfast (Best Supporting Actress)
 Julia Vernon for Cruella (Best Makeup and Hairstyling)
 Kenneth Branagh for Belfast (Best Picture, Best Director)
 Mark Taylor for No Time to Die (Best Sound)
 Nadia Stacey for Cruella (Best Makeup and Hairstyling)
 Naomi Donne for Cruella (Best Makeup and Hairstyling)
 Oliver Tarney for No Time to Die (Best Sound)
 Olivia Colman for The Lost Daughter (Best Actress)
 Paul Massey for No Time To Die (Best Sound)
 Richard Flynn for The Power of the Dog (Best Sound)
 Simon Chase for Belfast (Best Sound)
 Simon Hayes for No Time to Die (Best Sound)
 Tanya Seghatchian for The Power of the Dog (Best Picture)
 Affairs of the Art (Best Animated Short Film)
 Robin Robin (Best Animated Short Film)

Golden Globe Awards
The 79th Golden Globe Awards were held on 9 January 2022.

British winners:
 Belfast (Best Screenplay)
 The Power of the Dog (Best Motion Picture – Drama, Best Supporting Actor, Best Director)
 No Time to Die (Best Original Song)
  Kenneth Branagh (Best Screenplay for Belfast)
  Andrew Garfield (Best Performance in a Motion Picture – Musical or Comedy – Actor for Tick, Tick... Boom!)

British nominees:
 Belfast (Best Motion Picture – Drama, Best Supporting Actor, Best Supporting Actress, Best Director, Best Original Song)
 Cyrano (Best Motion Picture – Musical or Comedy, Best Performance in a Motion Picture – Musical or Comedy – Actor)
 Flee (Best Animated Feature)
 Passing (Best Supporting Actress)
 The Power of the Dog (Best Performance in a Motion Picture – Drama – Actor, Best Supporting Actress, Best Screenplay, Best Original Score)
 Spencer (Best Performance in a Motion Picture – Drama – Actress)
 Benedict Cumberbatch (Best Performance in a Motion Picture – Drama – Actor for The Power of the Dog)
 Jamie Hartman (Best Original Song for Respect)
 Jonny Greenwood (Best Original Score for The Power of the Dog)
 Kenneth Branagh (Best Motion Picture – Drama, Best Director for Belfast)
 Olivia Colman (Best Performance in a Motion Picture – Drama – Actress for The Lost Daughter)

See also 
Lists of British films
2022 in film
2022 in British music
2022 in British radio
2022 in British television
2022 in the United Kingdom
List of British films of 2021
List of British films of 2023

References

External links
 

Lists of 2022 films by country or language
2022